Kavinda de Tissera (born 17 January 1995) is a Sri Lankan cricketer. He made his first-class debut for Sinhalese Sports Club in the 2015–16 Premier League Tournament on 11 December 2015. His period of captaincy heading St Peter’s under 17 squad was most notable for his reputation for being one of the team’s batting anchor.

References

External links
 

1995 births
Living people
Sri Lankan cricketers
Sinhalese Sports Club cricketers
Cricketers from Colombo